Teulisna bipectinis is a moth of the family Erebidae. It is found in China (Yunnan, Guangxi, Hainan and Guangdong).

References

Moths described in 2000
bipectinis